Toussaint was the chief of a leper colony in South America ( 1890 – unknown, in Chacachacare), known for his appearance in the book Papillon.  The book recounted the escapes of Henri Charrière from the French penal colony of Devil's Island in French Guiana.  In 1934, Charriere, with his fellow prisoners Clusiot and Maturette, escaped from the penal colony.  During their escape, they went to Toussaint's leper colony to obtain money and a boat.

Toussaint was a Frenchman, and is believed to have himself served time at Devil's Island.  He contracted leprosy, most likely while in the penal colony.  Toussaint was sent to a leper colony on Chacachacare, and stayed in the colony for the rest of his life.

He was played by Anthony Zerbe in the film Papillon (1973).

References

Leprosy activists
1890s births
Year of birth uncertain
20th-century deaths
Year of death unknown